Wayne Ernest Mumford (born 3 November 1964) is a Welsh former professional footballer who played in the English Football League for Birmingham City.

Mumford was born in Rhymney, Monmouthshire, and brought up in Coventry, Warwickshire. Capped by Wales at youth level, he began his club career as an apprentice with Manchester City, but returned to the Midlands where he signed professional forms with Birmingham City in September 1982. He made his debut as a 17-year-old in the First Division on 16 October 1982 in a 1–1 draw at Nottingham Forest. This was the first of six starts for the first team: in each case he deputised competently for established right backs Dave Langan and Jim Hagan. Mumford also captained Birmingham's youth team. He was released in 1984, and went on to play Southern League football for Worcester City, Coventry Sporting, Leamington and Bedworth United, before a knee injury put an end to his career.

References

1964 births
Living people
People from Rhymney
Sportspeople from Caerphilly County Borough
Welsh footballers
Association football fullbacks
Manchester City F.C. players
Birmingham City F.C. players
Worcester City F.C. players
Coventry Sporting F.C. players
Leamington F.C. players
Bedworth United F.C. players
English Football League players
Southern Football League players